Utah Bison Herd may refer to:
 Antelope Island Bison Herd
 Henry Mountains Bison Herd